Wilmont Darnell Perry (born February 25, 1975) is a professional American football player who currently plays for the Cape Fear Heroes.

He also played running back for two seasons for the New Orleans Saints in 1998 and 1999. He played college football from 1994 to 1998 at Livingstone College in Salisbury, North Carolina. He was nominated to the Central Intercollegiate Athletic Association All-Conference teams in his junior and senior seasons. Perry also played in the Arena Football League.

References

1975 births
Living people
People from Franklinton, North Carolina
African-American players of American football
American football running backs
Livingstone Blue Bears football players
New Orleans Saints players
Players of American football from North Carolina
Cape Fear Wildcats players
Columbus Destroyers players
Richmond Raiders players
Cape Fear Heroes players
21st-century African-American sportspeople
20th-century African-American sportspeople